Bone in the Throat is 2015 a British-American crime drama film co-written and directed by Graham Henman and starring Ed Westwick, Tom Wilkinson, Andy Nyman, Vanessa Kirby, Rupert Graves, and John Hannah. The film premiered at the South by Southwest Film Festival on March 14, 2015.

Premise
A young, ambitious chef is mixed up with the East End London mob. While showing off his culinary skills, he finds himself trapped as a witness to a murder in his own kitchen.

Cast
 Ed Westwick as Will Reeves
 Tom Wilkinson as Charlie
 Andy Nyman as Ronnie the Rug
 Vanessa Kirby as Sophie
 Rupert Graves as Rupert
 John Hannah as Sullivan
 Neil Maskell as Lewis
 Steven Mackintosh as McDougal
 Tim Plester as Skinny
 Xavier Laurent as Chef Stephane

Production
In May 2012, it was reported that a film adaptation of Anthony Bourdain's novel Bone in the Throat was being made, to be directed by Graham Henman, who co-wrote the script with Mark Townend. Bourdain is executive producer for the project. Ed Westwick was cast in the lead role on May 6, 2013.

References

External links
 
 

2015 films
2015 crime drama films
American crime drama films
British crime drama films
2010s English-language films
Films scored by Lorne Balfe
2010s American films
2010s British films